The Marble Downs is an album by the Trembling Bells and Bonnie 'Prince' Billy. The album was released in 2012 by Honest Jon's Records in the UK. The album features vocals by Lavinia Blackwall of the Trembling Bells and Bonnie 'Prince' Billy.

Critical reception 

The album was not widely reviewed. However the reviews it did receive were generally positive. It received a score of 79/100 based on eight reviews on the Metacritic review aggregator website.

Track listing

Personnel 

 Martin Beer - bass
 Lavinia Blackwall - vocals, piano, organ, guitar, glockenspiel, percussion
 Dave Dixon - vocals
 Lucy Farrell - violin, viola
 Mike Hastings - guitar, lap-steel guitar
 Ross MacRae - trombone
 Michael John McCarthy - accordion
 Saoirse McDonald - recorder
 Richard Merchant - trumpet
 Alasdair C. Mitchell - vocals
 Alex Neilson - drums, bells, theremin, vocals
 Peter Nicholson - cello
 John Nicol - vocals
 Will "Bonnie Prince Billy" Oldham – vocals
 Sybren Renema - saxophone
 Simon Shaw - bass

References

Will Oldham albums
Trembling Bells albums
2012 albums
Honest Jon's Records albums